Greenisland Football Club is a Northern Irish, intermediate football club playing in Division 1C of the Northern Amateur Football League. The club is based in Greenisland, County Antrim, and was formed in 1995. The club plays in the Irish Cup.

References

External links
  Club website]

Association football clubs in Northern Ireland
Association football clubs established in 1995
Association football clubs in County Antrim
Northern Amateur Football League clubs
1995 establishments in Northern Ireland